Harsh Chhaya is an Indian actor. He debuted in a minor role as "Jijo" in the early 1990s Zee TV series Tara, but first came into prominence in the role of Krishnakant Trivedi (KT) in mid 1990s TV series Hasratein, where he portrayed the character of a wealthy boss who exploited his married employee (Savi) into an extramarital affair with him. Chhaya somewhat developed the on-screen image of a wealthy boss and played the similar character in the 2007 Bollywood film Laaga Chunari Mein Daag, where he takes advantage of his employee, played by Rani Mukerji.

Career
His first appearance was in the serial Aarohan (by Pallavi Joshi) in 1993 as Ankit Malik, and then his major breakthrough was the role of Karan in Swabhimaan, directed by Mahesh Bhatt in 1995. In 2002, Harsh acted in the serial Justajoo, directed by Ajay Sinha. Justajoo was a serial on Zee TV in 2002, which also starred Pallavi Joshi and Arpita Pandey. In 2006, he was seen as the CEO Naveen Shroff in Madhur Bhandarkar's Corporate. In 2007, he played a businessman named Kapoor in Sagar Ballary's Bheja Fry. All but two of his scenes were edited out in the final released version of this film. His performance as Vinay Khosla, a gay dress designer, was notable in Madhur Bhandarkar's 2008 critically acclaimed Fashion. Harsh Chhaya also played the role of Sanjay Gandhi in Shekhar Kapur's Pradhanmantri on ABP News.
He also worked in 24:India Season 2, as an ATU Chief Siddhant Sehgal

Personal life
Harsh was married to Shefali Shah. After a divorce with Shah, Harsh married actress Sunita Sengupta. He completed his Education at Delhi's Jamia Millia Islamia, where he pursued Mass Communication at the university's A.J.K. Mass Communication Research Centre.

Discography

Filmography

Films

Writer/Director

Television

Web series

References

External links
 
 

Living people
Indian male film actors
Indian male television actors
Male actors from Mumbai
Male actors in Hindi cinema
Jamia Millia Islamia alumni
20th-century Indian male actors
21st-century Indian male actors
Gujarati people
1970 births